Ann Maxwell (born April 5, 1944), also known as A.E. Maxwell and Elizabeth Lowell, is an American writer. She has individually, and with co-author and husband Evan, written more than 50 novels and one non-fiction book. Her novels range from science fiction to historical fiction, and from romance to mystery to suspense.

Biography

Early years
As a child, Maxwell read primarily classic literature. She did not read her first science fiction novel until college, and was not exposed to other genres, such as romance, until even later.

Maxwell earned a B.A. in English literature from the University of California, Riverside in 1966. Shortly thereafter, she married Evan Maxwell, a now former newspaper reporter who spent over fifteen years working for the LA Times, covering international crime. Early in their marriage, Maxwell became very bored. Her husband worked from 4:00 PM to midnight, and as there was no bus service near their house and Evan needed the car for work, Maxwell found herself alone at home with their toddler son. Maxwell did not like television and claims to have read all of the science fiction books in the local public library, in addition to everything science fiction in a local second-hand book store. After having exhausted all of her local Science Fiction options, she seated herself in front of her ancient manual typewriter and began to write a book she would enjoy, even though she had no training in creative writing.

When Maxwell finished her book, a science fiction novel, she submitted it to several publishers. Over nine months later she began to receive rejection letters for it. After finally finding an agent to represent her, she was able to sell her first book, Change

Career
Ann Maxwell has written over 50 novels, some individually and some in collaboration with her husband. Her novels have been published in 21 foreign languages, and there are over 23 million copies of her books in print.

Science fiction
Ann Maxwell began her writing career in the science fiction genre. Her first novel, Change, was published in 1975. Over the next decade, eight other science fiction novels followed. Seven of those novels were recommended for the Science Fiction Writers of America Nebula Award, with the first coming within one vote of being a Nebula Award finalist. Another, A Dead God Dancing, was nominated for what was then called TABA (The American Book Award).

Collaborations
Ann and her husband Evan, in conjunction with Ivar Ruud, a Norwegian polar bear hunter, published the non-fiction work The Year-Long Day in 1976. This book had been published in four countries and was condensed in Reader's Digest.

Several years later the couple began collaborating on a crime novel. This resulted in a series of books about a couple named Fiddler and Fiora, all published under the name A.E. Maxwell. The University of California gave one of the books, The Frog and the Scorpion, a creative writing award. Time magazine named Just Enough Light to Kill, one of the best crime novels of 1988.

The couple have also produced four best-selling suspense novels. Although these books are the result of a collaboration, they are published as Ann Maxwell, as the publisher wanted to use a woman's name.

Ann and Evan have also collaborated to write the novelization of the 1992 Val Kilmer movie Thunderheart. This novel is written under the pen name Lowell Charters, taking his middle name and her maiden name.

The couple have a structured system for their collaborations to minimize arguments. Evan Maxwell usually chooses the setting for the story. Together, the pair create the characters and then the plot. Once the plot has been fairly well established, Evan writes the first draft of the manuscript, consulting Ann if there are any major questions about the characters or plot changes that he would like to make. Ann then writes the second draft, with the freedom to make any changes that she thinks are necessary for "clarity, pacing, dialogue, and characterization."

Romance
The first dedicated word processor was introduced after Maxwell had already become established as a science fiction writer. She bought one immediately and soon found that she had tripled her productivity, as she was no longer forced to spend a great deal of time retyping her pages as she edited. This enabled her to get ahead of her contract, so Maxwell began to look for another type of writing that she would enjoy, but that would pay better.

Maxwell approached her agent for ideas. The agent suggested that she look into thrillers, romance novels and horror fiction, as all three were becoming very popular. After reading several horror novels, Maxwell realized that she would not enjoy writing that type of fiction. Her husband brought her five Silhouette novels, three of which were for a brand-new line, Sihouette Desire. Although Maxwell thought the novels were well written, she did not really enjoy the first four stories. The last one that she read, Corporate Affair by Stephanie James (a.k.a. Jayne Ann Krentz) made her fall in love with the genre. Because she had never read romance novels before, Maxwell picked up over fifty additional category romances to familiarize herself with the expected format and then set out to write her own romance. The resulting novel, Summer Thunder, published in 1982, was the debut of her romance career. This novel, and the more than thirty that have followed, are published under the pseudonym Elizabeth Lowell, a combination of Ann's middle name (Elizabeth) and Evan's middle name (Lowell), even though the books are written solely by Ann.

After several years writing category romances, Maxwell turned to historical romance. After she and her husband stopped writing their own mysteries, Maxwell found that she missed writing suspenseful plots and chose to take a slight turn into contemporary romantic suspense. She has no plans to return to the historical romance genre.

Maxwell's romance novels have consistently placed on The New York Times bestseller list. She has been awarded the Romantic Times Career Achievement Award in 1994, the Romance Writers of America RITA Award for Best Historical Romance in 1999 and The Romance Writers of America awarded her a Lifetime Achievement Award in 1994.

Family
Maxwell spends her free time hiking, fishing for salmon, cooking, gardening, or spending time on the family's boat. She and her husband live in the Pacific Northwest. They have a son, Matthew, and a daughter, Heather, who are now grown. Maxwell's daughter has published several books under the pseudonym Heather Lowell.

Bibliography

As Ann Maxwell

Science fiction
 Timeshadow Rider  —1986
 Dancer's Illusion —1983
 Dancer's Luck —1983
 Fire Dancer —1982
 The Jaws Of Menx —1981
 Name Of A Shadow —1980
 A Dead God Dancing —1979
 The Singer Enigma —1976
 Change —1975

In collaboration with Evan Maxwell
 Shadow and Silk (1997)
 The Ruby (1995)
 The Secret Sister (1993)
 The Diamond Tiger written under Ann Maxwell (1992)

As A.E. Maxwell

Crime novels
 Murder Hurts —1993
 The King Of Nothing —1992
 Money Burns —1991
 The Art Of Survival —1989
 Just Enough Light To Kill —1988
 Gatsby's Vineyard —1987
 The Frog And The Scorpion —1986
 Just Another Day In Paradise —1985

Historical fiction
 The Golden Mountain written under Annalise Sun (1990)
 The Redwood Empire (Harlequin Historical #267) (1987)
 Golden Empire (1979)

As Elizabeth Lowell

Romantic suspense
 Night Diver (2014)
 Beautiful Sacrifice (released 26 Dec 2012)
 Death Echo (HC Jun 8, 2010)
 Blue Smoke and Murder (HC Jun 2008 — PB Mar 2009)
 Innocent as Sin (HC Jul 2007 — PB May 2008)
 Whirlpool (rewrite of The Ruby) (Nov 2006)
 The Wrong Hostage (HC Jun 2006 — PB May 2007)
 The Secret Sister (Nov 2005)
 Always Time To Die (HC Jul 2005—PB Jun 2006)
 Death is Forever (rewrite of The Diamond Tiger) (Dec 2004)
 The Color of Death (HC Jun 2004—PB Jun 2005)
 Die in Plain Sight (HC Jul 2003—PB Jun 2004)
 Running Scared (HC May 2002—PB Jun 2003)
 Moving Target (HC Jun 2001—PB May 2002)
 Midnight in Ruby Bayou (HC Jun 2000—PB May 2001)
 Pearl Cove (HC Jun 1999—PB Jun 2000)
 Jade Island (HC Sep 1998—PB Apr 1999)
 Amber Beach (HC Oct 1997—PB Oct 1998)
 Tell Me No Lies (PB 1986)

Contemporary romance
These books are rewrites of novels previously published under the Silhouette Intimate Moments line
 This Time Love - 2003
 Eden Burning - 2002
 Beautiful Dreamer - 2001
 Remember Summer - 1999
 To the Ends of the Earth - 1998
 Where the Heart Is - 1997
 Desert Rain - 1996
 A Woman Without Lies - 1995
 Lover in the Rough - 1994
 Forget Me Not - 1994

These books were in the Silhouette Desire line
 077 Summer Thunder (1983)
 256 Chain Lightning (1988)
 265 The Fire Of Spring (1986)
 319 Too Hot To Handle (1986)
 355 Love Song For A Raven (1987)
 415 Fever (1988)
 462 Dark Fire (1988)
 546 Fire And Rain (1990)
 624 Outlaw (1991)
 625 Granite Man (1991)
 631 Warrior (1991)

Historical romance
 Winter Fire (1996)
 Autumn Lover (1996)
 Only Love (1995, reissued 2003)
 Enchanted (1994)
 Forbidden (1993)
 Untamed (1993)
 Only You (1992, reissued 2003)
 Only Mine (1992, reissued 2003)
 Only His (1991, reissued 2003)
 Reckless Love (1992) - Harlequin Historical

References

External links
 Elizabeth Lowell's website
 Chapter excerpts and title list (Official publisher web page)
 Elizabeth Lowell Blog

 Elizabeth Lowell's Amazon.com page

1944 births
Living people
20th-century American novelists
21st-century American novelists
American crime fiction writers
American romantic fiction writers
American science fiction writers
American women novelists
University of California, Riverside alumni
Women science fiction and fantasy writers
Women romantic fiction writers
20th-century American women writers
21st-century American women writers
RITA Award winners
Women crime fiction writers